The 1897 Iowa Hawkeyes football team  represented the University of Iowa during the 1897 college football season. The team was coached by Otto Wagonhurst, the last coach in Iowa Hawkeyes football history to coach for only one season. The next year, Iowa hired Alden Knipe as the team's head coach.

Schedule

References

Iowa
Iowa Hawkeyes football seasons
Iowa Hawkeyes football